St. Michel Arena is a 2,000-seat indoor arena in Montreal, Quebec, Canada that was built in 1968. It served as the weightlifting venue of the 1976 Summer Olympics and is located about 4.4 km west of the Olympic Stadium. The capacity was temporarily raised to 2,700 for the games.

References
1976 Summer Olympics official report. Volume 2. pp. 130–3.

Sports venues in Montreal
Venues of the 1976 Summer Olympics
Olympic weightlifting venues
Sports venues completed in 1968